Aleksandr Dzhigero (born 15 April 1996) is a Belarusian professional footballer who plays for Okzhetpes.

Honours
BATE Borisov
Belarusian Premier League champion: 2015, 2016, 2017
Belarusian Super Cup winner: 2017

References

External links
 
 
 Profile at BATE website

1996 births
Living people
Footballers from Minsk
Belarusian footballers
Association football midfielders
Belarusian expatriate footballers
Expatriate footballers in Kazakhstan
FC BATE Borisov players
FC Energetik-BGU Minsk players
FC Dnepr Mogilev players
FC Luch Minsk (2012) players
FC Torpedo Minsk players
FC Smolevichi players
FC Neman Grodno players
FC Minsk players
FC Okzhetpes players